20 Disco Greats / 20 Love Songs is a double album released by British pop group Brotherhood of Man which was released as two separate albums, but sold together as a 'buy one get one free' package, as was the popular trend at the time.

Background 
This album was a collection of cover versions, following on from their successful Sing 20 Number One Hits album released a year earlier. The songs contained were cover versions of hit songs from the UK charts spanning the years 1972 to 1981. The album was released by Warwick Records (United Kingdom) in November 1981, but failed to replicate the success of the previous one, thus ending their contract with the label. Some months later, the group commented on the album; "we recorded [the album] to keep the group together and get our faces on the TV screen where they were advertised". On the lack of new material present they said "we didn't bother to release a single or record a proper album because we knew they wouldn't make any impact".

The album contained no single releases. The label on the 20 Disco Greats record gives the title as Dance Yourself Dizzy, while the label on 20 Love Songs gives the title as In Love. Although listed separately, the songs "Copacabana" and "I'll Go Where Your Music Takes Me" merge into each other, and have been listed as one track on subsequent compilation releases. The song "She's out of My Life" is listed as such, but is sung (by member Sandra Stevens) as "He's out of My Life". A noticeable trend on the album was the tendency to reverse the sex of the original performer. Where songs had been originally performed by males, they were performed here by the female members, such as Rod Stewart's "Do Ya Think I'm Sexy" sung by Sandra and Nicky and Baccara's "Yes Sir I Can Boogie" by Martin and Lee.

Of the covers contained, the earliest was Harry Nilsson's version of "Without You", which was a No.1 hit in March 1972, while the most recent was Stevie Wonder's "Happy Birthday", which had reached No.2 in August 1981. Of the 40 tracks, 13 had been UK No.1s, while all the rest were UK top 20 hits apart from "Copacabana" and "I'll Go Where Your Music Takes Me", which reached No.42 and No.23 respectively. The album contained three songs by The Bee Gees, as well as Barbra Streisand's "Woman in Love", which was written by them. ABBA - a group Brotherhood of Man had been compared to many times during their career, were included with a cover of their song "Lay All Your Love On Me", which at the time was the group's most recent (although one of their less significant) hit.

The album was released on Vinyl and Cassette, and although has never been released on Compact Disc, many of the tracks have appeared on various compilation CDs of the group in recent years. The cover photos were taken at Tokyo Joe's night club (now defunct) in Mayfair, London. During the photo-shoot, the group were presented with gold discs of their previous album by Ian Miles, managing director of Warwick records.

Track listing

20 Disco Greats

20 Love Songs

Personnel 
 Martin Lee – vocals
 Lee Sheriden – vocals
 Nicky Stevens – vocals
 Sandra Stevens – vocals
 Tony Hiller – Producer
 Colin Frechter – Arranger
 Paul Chave – Photography

References 

1981 albums
Brotherhood of Man albums
Covers albums
Warwick Records (United Kingdom) albums
Albums produced by Tony Hiller